The Bamboozle Road Show 2010 was the third Bamboozle Road Show, an American nationwide concert tour based on the Bamboozle Festival. Each concert in the tour featured a main stage for well-known bands and a second stage for lesser known bands to perform on. The bands who performed on the main stage on the 2010 tour were headliners All Time Low, Boys Like Girls, LMFAO and Third Eye Blind, supported by Good Charlotte, Hanson, Forever the Sickest Kids, Hellogoodbye and Cartel. Tickets went on sale on to the public on 6 March 2010. The tour included 24 shows in 17 states from 21 May to 27 June 2010 after 2 dates were cancelled due to scheduling issues. All Time Low was banned from one Texas show after they criticized the way their fans were handled at a previous show when some fans were pepper sprayed by police for fighting over a T-shirt thrown into the crowd.

Bands
All Time Low (except 6/13 & 6/24)
Boys Like Girls
3OH!3 (6/2)
LMFAO (6/10-6/26)
Third Eye Blind (6/3-6/27)
Good Charlotte
Hanson (5/21-5/30)
Travie McCoy (6/2)
A Cursive Memory (6/5-6/6)
Cady Groves
Cartel (5/21-5/30)
The Downtown Fiction (5/21-6/6 except 5/28)
Forever the Sickest Kids
Great Big Planes (Except 5/28)
Hellogoodbye (6/5-6/15)
I Fight Dragons (6/2)
Michael and Marisa (6/24-6/27)
Mercy Mercedes (Except 5/28)
The Ready Set (Except 5/28)
Shwayze (6/5-6/6)
Simple Plan (6/18-6/27)
Stereo Skyline (6/10-6/27)
Vedera (6/24-6/27)
Vita Chambers (Except 5/28)

Tour dates

Bamboozle tour controversy
During the Bamboozle Road Show of 2010, controversy arose over the use of pepper spray at a concert.  A show at a Six Flags park in Arlington, Texas, according to a Six Flags spokesperson, became rowdy, and park staff used pepper spray on the crowd.
Six Flags took the band off the bill on Sunday night.  Singer Alex Gaskarth reported on Twitter that they had been "banned" from the park; according to Six Flags, the band chose to drop off the bill.

All Time Low was later banned from playing the rest of the Six Flags venue dates on the Bamboozle Roadshow. Alex Gaskarth posted on their official Myspace page via a blog: "I know there have been a lot of questions floating around, so I just wanted to reach out and let you guys know what's going on with the remaining Six Flags shows on the Bamboozle Roadshow tour.  We'd really love to be there, but unfortunately we're not allowed to play the shows in Eureka, Missouri and Jackson, New Jersey.  I promise that we'll make it all up to you very soon."

References

2010 concert tours